Ranggung LRT station (SE5) is an elevated Light Rail Transit (LRT) station on the Sengkang LRT line East Loop in Compassvale, Sengkang, Singapore along Sengkang East Avenue near the junction of Compassvale Lane. This station is located near The Rivervale condominium.

Etymology

The burung ranggung in Malay is a species of "stork" which lives along the Punggol seashore.

History
The station opened on 18 January 2003, along with the rest of the Sengkang LRT line East Loop.

References

External links

Railway stations in Singapore opened in 2003
LRT stations in Sengkang
Light Rail Transit (Singapore) stations